The Hollywood Palace was an hourlong American television variety show broadcast Saturday nights (except September 1967 to January 1968, when it was seen Monday nights) on ABC from January 4, 1964, to February 7, 1970. Titled The Saturday Night Hollywood Palace for its first few weeks, it began as a midseason replacement for The Jerry Lewis Show, another variety show, which had lasted only three months.

It was staged in Hollywood at the former Hollywood Playhouse (where Lewis's series had originated, temporarily renamed "The Jerry Lewis Theater" from September through December 1963) on Vine Street, which was renamed the Hollywood Palace during the show's duration and subsequently renamed Avalon Hollywood. A little-known starlet, Raquel Welch, was cast during the first season as the "Billboard Girl", who placed the names of the acts on a placard (similar to that of a vaudeville house).  The show's musical theme was a fast-paced instrumental rendition of "Put On a Happy Face" from the 1960 Broadway musical Bye Bye Birdie.

Overview
Unlike similar programs such as The Ed Sullivan Show, the series used a different host each week. Among the show's many performers and hosts were Bing Crosby (who hosted the series' first and final episodes and had the most appearances as guest host: 31 in all, including his family on several of the annual Christmas shows), Dean Martin, Liberace, Frank Sinatra, Milton Berle, Sammy Davis Jr., Sid Caesar, Peter Lawford, The Rolling Stones, Groucho Marx, Joan Crawford, Bette Davis, Tony Bennett, Judy Garland, Jimmy Durante, The Supremes, Ginger Rogers, The Temptations, Dusty Springfield, Phyllis Diller, and Elizabeth Montgomery. (Martin's hosting was a bit ironic, given that the slot had been vacated by his ex-partner Jerry Lewis. Martin alluded to this in the March 7, 1964, episode, thanking Lewis for "building me this theater". He enjoyed the gig enough to subsequently agree to star in his own variety series, The Dean Martin Show, which premiered on NBC in 1965 and ran for nine years.)

Les Brown and his Orchestra served as house band for the first season, with Mitchell Ayres and his Orchestra taking over for the remainder of the run. Joe Lipman served as the show's primary orchestrator and arranger (46 episodes).  The off-screen announcer for each program was Dick Tufeld. Grey Lockwood served as director for the show's entire run.

The opening set framing the host established a unique show opening with Jim Trittipo's stage set. After the opening, the set transformed into a second set, with set pieces either splitting apart or turning around and additional flying set pieces dropping in or flying out on camera, as well as scenic theatrical magic act transforming before the camera while each new act was introduced. This novelty was established as The Hollywood Palace'''s specialty. This opening transition broke the normal scheduled commercial time-slot breaks, with the commercial break occurring far into the show's first 15-minute segment.

A number of popular music performers got their start on the show; among them were The Rolling Stones, who made their first US television appearance on the June 6, 1964, episode, and The Jackson 5, who made their first national television appearance on the October 18, 1969 episode. The folk-rock group We Five performed their hit "You Were on My Mind" within a few weeks of its release in 1965. During their 1964 appearance, the Rolling Stones were repeatedly ridiculed, before and after their performance of Muddy Waters' "I Just Want To Make Love To You", by Martin. At the time, they were relatively unknown in the U.S., and a second song recorded in the same session, Buddy Holly's "Not Fade Away", was not shown until the second episode of the second season, hosted by Ed Wynn, that aired on September 26, 1964. The February 25, 1967, edition featured the American television debut of the Beatles' music videos for "Penny Lane" and "Strawberry Fields Forever", introduced by guest host Van Johnson.

The show, as well as all the ABC's Talmadge Main Lot programming, was televised in black and white until September 1965, when color telecasts began. The facility was the first color studio renovated by ABC Television on the West Coast, converted during The Hollywood Palace's summer hiatus. Sharing the studio, scheduling Sunday through Wednesday, The Lawrence Welk Show was moved to Vine Street to broadcast in color at Welk's request, but the Welk Orchestra had to be reduced to fit on the stage. Given the orchestra plan, Welk drew a pencil line on the right side of the plan, announcing, "lose them!"

The adjacent parking lot became an outdoor staging area for high-wire and trapeze performers, circus animal acts with elephants, lions, tigers, chimps, and performer acts that could not be booked on The Ed Sullivan Show. The producers could schedule Las Vegas and Reno casino performers, comedians, musicians, specialty acts by flying performers into Los Angeles via Burbank Airport for appearances on The Hollywood Palace. Exposure of the Knickerbocker Hotel's electric sign atop the rear building, behind the Palace Theater, was a unique advertisement shown in every parking lot act.

Like The Ed Sullivan Show on CBS, all of the episodes of The Hollywood Palace (save its final episode in 1970) were taped before a live audience; a laugh and applause track was also used for "sweetening" purposes. During the 1967 season, studies were made to convert the stage, which would have a swimming pool beneath a sliding stage floor that would cover the pool, with a third ice rink floor that could slide atop the stage floor. Storing these sliding floors required owning the property behind the theater building. The Knickerbocker Hotel was directly behind the building, but ABC could not purchase the hotel property from the Methodist Church, which had converted the hotel into a residential retirement facility. Moving the show to a Culver City soundstage was considered, but scuttled because of the expense. Vanoff later used this format concept for the 1980 NBC variety series The Big Show, using a soundstage on the Sunset Gower Studios lot, which included a three-ring stage, ice rink, swimming pool for aquatic staging, and an audience area.

For most of its television run, with a lead-in of The Lawrence Welk Show at 8:30 pm, at 9:30, The Hollywood Palace enjoyed consistently respectable ratings, although it never made the top 30 programs. By the start of the 1969-1970 season (its seventh), the ratings had slipped, and ABC canceled the series in February 1970. Bing Crosby hosted the final episode, sans audience, which consisted of clips from previous shows.

Compilation show
On December 16, 2004, a television special titled Christmas at the Hollywood Palace was broadcast on PBS. It included performances by Crosby and 15 clips from past Christmas shows of the series. It also included interviews with Bing's wife Kathryn Crosby, Bing's children Harry and Mary Crosby, and Hollywood Palace producer Bill Harbach.

AwardsThe Hollywood Palace'' won one Emmy out of eight nominations, for James Trittipo for art direction in 1966. The same year, it was nominated for a variety series, arranging (Joe Lipman), costume design (Ed Smith), and conducting (Mitchell Ayres). Ayres received another Emmy nomination for his work on the series in 1968, when two more nominations for the series went to Nick V. Giordano and Herb Weiss, both for individual achievement in electronic production.

List of guest stars

1964

1965

1966

1967

1968

1969

1970

References

External links

 
 The Hollywood Palace at The Internet Archive

1964 American television series debuts
1970 American television series endings
1960s American variety television series
1970s American variety television series
American Broadcasting Company original programming
Black-and-white American television shows
English-language television shows